Literally meaning "Red Cape", is both a cape on the southwestern coast of the Dominican Republic, and a beach on the same location. More specifically, it belongs to Pedernales Province, the southernmost province of the country.

This part of the country is known for its bauxite mines and its beautiful beaches like Bahia de las Aguilas and Cabo Rojo.

References 

http://www.mi-rd.com/Provincias/Pedernales/Pedernales.htm

Capes of the Dominican Republic
Beaches of the Dominican Republic
Geography of Pedernales Province